Aghora may refer to:
The Hindu god Bhairava, a form of Shiva
Aghori, a particular school of Hindu Tantra
Aghor Yoga, subsect of the Aghora lineage
Aghora (band), a Floridian progressive metal band
Aghora (album), an album by Aghora

See also
Agora (disambiguation)